This article refers to one of the former prefectures of Chad. From 2002 the country was divided into 18 regions.

Mayo-Kébbi was one of the 14 prefectures of Chad. Located in the southwest of the country, Mayo-Kébbi covered an area of 30,105 square kilometers and had a population of 825,158 in 1993. Its capital was Bongor.

References

Prefectures of Chad